The Human Rights Measurement Initiative finds that Equatorial Guinea is fulfilling 43.5% of what it should be fulfilling for the right to health based on its level of income. When looking at the right to health with respect to children, Equatorial Guinea achieves 64.4% of what is expected based on its current income. In regards to the right to health amongst the adult population, the country achieves only 58.8% of what is expected based on the nation's level of income.  Equatorial Guinea falls into the "very bad" category when evaluating the right to reproductive health because the nation is fulfilling only 7.3% of what the nation is expected to achieve based on the resources (income) it has available.

Health status 
Malaria, HIV/AIDS, and pediatrics are major health concerns in Equatorial Guinea.

Equatorial Guinea has three doctors per 10,000 people.

Life expectancy 
The 2018 CIA estimated average life expectancy in Equatorial Guinea for males was 63.8 years and 66.2 years for females for a total population life expectancy of 65 years.

HIV/AIDS
The HIV/AIDS prevalence was 6.50 per 100 adults in 2017. As of 2017, there were approximately 53,000 people living with HIV/AIDS in the country. There were an estimated 1,800 deaths from AIDS in 2018.

Maternal and child healthcare
There has been a marked improvement in infant mortality over the past 15 years. In 2018, the infant mortality rate was 63.3 per 1,000 live births. The maternal mortality rate in 2015 was 342 deaths per 100,000 live births.

Hospitals
There are 47 medical facilities in Equatorial Guinea, including seven regional hospitals, eleven district hospitals, and 29 health centre.

References